Cagnano Amiterno is a comune and town in the Province of L'Aquila in the Abruzzo region of central Italy.

It is located in the natural park known as the "Gran Sasso e Monti della Laga National Park".

It was the location of the former Latin Catholic bishopric of Amiterno.

References

Cities and towns in Abruzzo